Roscoe Todd Karns (January 15, 1921 – February 5, 2000) was an American actor. He is perhaps best remembered for playing George Bailey's younger brother, Harry Bailey, in the 1946 film It's a Wonderful Life.

Early life 
Karns was the son of the well-known character actor Roscoe Karns and his wife Mary Fraso. He initially planned to have a career as a newspaper reporter, but participation in a little theater production changed his mind, turning him toward acting.

Film 
Karns started his film career in 1941 as Harry Land in two Andy Hardy movies with Mickey Rooney, but shortly after that, his beginning film career was interrupted by the Second World War, where Karns served in the Army Air Corps. When he returned to Hollywood, Karnes portrayed his signature role as Harry Bailey in Frank Capra's Christmas classic It's a Wonderful Life (1946).

He often had minor film roles, such as in Good Sam (1948) and The Caine Mutiny (1954).

Television 
Karns played Jackson Jones in Jackson and Jill (1949–1953), the first weekly situation comedy for television. He also appeared with his father Roscoe in the criminal series Rocky King, Detective (1950–1954), playing Sergeant Hart. He retired from film and television in the mid-1950s.

Later years 
Karns and his wife Katherine with their three children moved to Mexico near Guadalajara where they opened the English-language venue, Lakeside Little Theater in 1971. There Karns produced and directed plays for the next three decades, until his death from cancer at age 79.

Painting 
In addition to acting, Karns also made numerous paintings. He began painting in January 1948 and went on to sell his works to individuals and to businesses. A newspaper reporter wrote, "His style is strictly his own and bears no resemblance to anything ever heard in an art class or put in a book."

Death 
Karns died of cancer in Ajijic, Jalisco, Mexico, on February 5, 2000, at age 79. His wife and children had his private family interment in Ajijic's cemetery.

Partial filmography 

 Andy Hardy's Private Secretary (1941) as Harry Land
 The Courtship of Andy Hardy (1942) as Harry Land
 Eagle Squadron (1942) as Meyers
 It's a Wonderful Life (1946) as Harry Bailey
 Good Sam (1948) as Joe Adams
 Jackson and Jill (1949, TV series) as Jackson Jones
 My Foolish Heart (1949) as Her escort
 It's a Small World (1950) as Sam
 Let's Dance (1950) as Sergeant (uncredited)
 The Magnificent Yankee (1950) as Secretary (uncredited)
 Drums in the Deep South (1951) as Union Captain (uncredited)
 The Red Badge of Courage (1951) as Soldier (uncredited)
 Mutiny (1952) as Andrews
 Jet Job (1952) as Peter Arlen
 My Son John (1952) as Bedford (uncredited)
 The Story of Will Rogers (1952) as 1st Mechanic (scenes deleted)
 Battle Zone (1952) as Officer
 Flat Top (1952) as Judge
 Invaders from Mars (1953) as Jim as Gas Station Attendant (uncredited)
 Mission Over Korea (1953) as 2nd Lt. Jerry Barker (uncredited)
 Clipped Wings (1953) as Lt. Dave Moreno
 China Venture (1953) as Lt. March (uncredited)
 Sea of Lost Ships (1953) as Co-Pilot (uncredited)
 Rocky King, Detective (1953–1954, TV-series) as Sergeant Hart
 The Caine Mutiny (1954) as Petty Officer 1st Class Stillwell (uncredited)

References 
Citations

External links 

 
 

1921 births
2000 deaths
American male film actors
Male actors from Hollywood, Los Angeles
20th-century American male actors
United States Army Air Forces personnel of World War II
American male television actors
American emigrants to Mexico
People from Ajijic
Deaths from cancer in Mexico